George Bradley (December 5, 1881 – June 9, 1942) was a United States Navy officer and a recipient of America's highest military decoration – the Medal of Honor.

Biography
George Bradley was born on December 5, 1881, in New York, New York. He enlisted in the U.S. Navy from Rhode Island in the early 1900s and served as a Chief Gunner's Mate on the  during the intervention at Veracruz, Mexico in April 1914. When U.S. Naval Forces landed there and came under fire, Bradley led the ammunition party and special details. For his "meritorious service under fire," he was later awarded the Medal of Honor.

Bradley was promoted to the warrant officer rank of Gunner in February 1915. During the next two years he served in the armored cruiser , which conducted training exercises along the East Coast during the first months of World War I. In the summer of 1917, after reporting to the Naval Torpedo Station, Newport, Rhode Island, Bradley was temporarily promoted to Lieutenant. He reverted to Chief Gunner in August 1920 and was assigned to Destroyer Division 18, part of the Pacific Fleet. In 1922, he transferred to the Washington Navy Yard in Washington, D.C. During his tour of duty there, Bradley was presented with the Medal of Honor by President Calvin Coolidge on October 4, 1923. Upon his retirement in October 1932, Bradley was again promoted to Lieutenant. George Bradley died on June 9, 1942, and is buried at St. Columba's Cemetery, Middletown, Rhode Island.

Medal of Honor citation
Rank and organization: Chief Gunner's Mate, U.S. Navy. Born: S December 1881, New York, N.Y. Accredited to: Rhode Island. G.O. No.: 117, September 13, 1923.

Citation:

For meritorious service under fire on the occasion of the landing of the American naval forces at Vera Cruz in 1914. C.G. Bradley was then attached to the U.S.S. Utah, as a chief gunner's mate, and was in charge of the ammunition party and special details at Vera Cruz. (Medal presented by President Coolidge at the White House on 4 October 1923.)

See also

List of Medal of Honor recipients (Veracruz)

References

United States Navy Medal of Honor recipients
United States Navy officers
Military personnel from New York City
1881 births
1942 deaths
Burials in Rhode Island
Battle of Veracruz (1914) recipients of the Medal of Honor